Google Public Data Explorer provides public data and forecasts from a range of international organizations and academic institutions including the World Bank, OECD, Eurostat and the University of Denver. These can be displayed as line graphs, bar graphs, cross sectional plots or on maps.  The product was launched on March 8, 2010 as an experimental visualization tool in Google Labs.

In 2011 the Public Data Explorer was made available for anyone to upload, share and visualize data sets. To facilitate this, Google created a new data format, the Dataset Publishing Language (DSPL).  Once the data is imported, a dataset can be visualized, embedded in external websites, and shared with others like a Google Doc.

In 2016, this toolset was enhanced with the Google Analytics Suite, particularly Data Studio 360, whose release expanded to a free public beta in May 2016, which enabled import of public or individual datasets and overlaid user-friendly (non-coding) data visualization tools.

SDMX conversion 
The SDMX converter is an open source application, which offers the ability to convert DSPL (Google's Dataset Publishing Language) messages to SDMX-ML, and vice versa. The output file of a DSPL dataset is a zip file containing data (CSV files) and metadata (XML file). Datasets in this format can be processed by Google and visualized in the Google Public Data Explorer.

See also
 Trendalyzer

References

Further reading 
 Eurostat data as open data: experience with Google and with the open data community by  Chris Laevaert, May 2012
 Enhancing Data Discovery and Exploration by Jürgen Schwärzler, March 2011
 Using the Google Public Data Explorer as a Learning Tool in the University Geography Classroom by Thomas Pingel and Devin Moeller, October 2014

External links 
 
 International Telecommunication Union Data Explorer
 United Nations Human Development Reports

Public Data Explorer
Data visualization software
Online databases